The Fountain Palace is a residential skyscraper located in Xitun District, Taichung, Taiwan. It was completed in 2010 and was designed by C.Y. Lee & Partners.

See also 
 List of tallest buildings in Taiwan
 List of tallest buildings in Taichung
 Taichung's 7th Redevelopment Zone
 Savoy Palace (skyscraper)
 Plato Palace

References

2010 establishments in Taiwan
Residential skyscrapers in Taiwan
Skyscrapers in Taichung
Taichung's 7th Redevelopment Zone
Apartment buildings in Taiwan
Neoclassical architecture in Taiwan